The 1948 Iowa Hawkeyes football team was an American football team that represented the University of Iowa in the 1948 Big Nine Conference football season. The team compiled a 4–5 record (2–4 against conference opponents) and finished in a tie for fifth place in the Big Nine Conference.

Head coach Eddie Anderson was in his seventh and final season as Iowa's head coach; he was inducted into the College Football Hall of Fame in 1971.

The team's statistical leaders included Jerry Faske with 491 rushing yards, quarterback Al DiMarco with 1,105 passing yards, and Bob McKenzie with 382 receiving yards. DiMarco was selected as the team's most valuable player. Three Iowa players received either All-American or All-Big Nine honors in 1948:

 Tackle Bill Kay was selected by the Associated Press (AP) as a second-team honoree on the 1948 College Football All-America Team. He was also selected by both the AP and United Press (UP) as a first-team honoree on the 1948 All-Big Nine Conference football team.
 End Bob McKenzie was selected by the AP and UP as a second-team player on the All-Big Nine team.
 Al DiMarco was selected by the International News Service as a second-team player on its All-Big Nine team.

Other players of note on the 1948 team included Jack Dittmer, who later played six years in Major League Baseball.

The team played its home games at Iowa Stadium. It drew 212,708 spectators at five home games, an average of 42,542 per game.

Schedule

References

Iowa
Iowa Hawkeyes football seasons
Iowa Hawkeyes football